Admiralty Lake was a proglacial lake in the basin of what is now Lake Ontario.
The shoreline of Admiralty Lake was about  lower than Lake Ontario. The shoreline of Glacial Lake Iroquois, an earlier proglacial lake, was much higher than Lake Ontario's, because a lobe of the Laurentian Glacier blocked what is now the valley of the St Lawrence River. Lake Iroquois drained over the Niagara Escarpment, and down the Mohawk River. When the lobe of the glacier retreated the weight of the glacier kept the outlet of the St Lawrence River lower than the current level. As the glacier continued to retreat the region of the Thousand Islands rebounded, and the lake filled to its current level.

References

Bibliography
"Nearshore Geology". Aquatichabitat.ca. Archived from the original on 2012-01-27.
J Terasmae, E Mirynech (1964). "Postglacial chronology and the origin of deep lake basins in Prince Edward County, Ontario". Conference on Great Lakes Research, 1964 - International Association for Great Lakes Research.

Proglacial lakes
Geology of New York (state)
Glacial lakes of Canada